Monodontides apona is a butterfly of the family Lycaenidae. It is found on Mindanao in the Philippines.

References

 , 1983. Blue Butterflies of the Lycaenopsis Group: 1-309, 6 pls. London
, 1910. Neue Cyaniris-Rassen und Übersicht der bekannten Arten. Stettiner Entomologische Zeitung 71 (1909): 282-305.
, 1917. Revision der Lycaenidengattung Lycaenopsis. Arch. Naturgesch. 82 (A) (1) (1916): 1-42, 2 pls.
, 1927b-1928: Eine Revision der javanischen, zu Lycaenopsis und verwandten Genera gehörigen Arten. Tijdschrift Voor Entomologie 70: 232-302, 1pl., 27 figs; ibid. 71: 179-265, 1 pl., 29 figs.

Monodontides
Butterflies described in 1910